Inhapi is a municipality located in the western of the Brazilian state of Alagoas. Its population is 18,392 (2020) and its area is 374 km².

References

Municipalities in Alagoas